April Flowers may refer to:
April Flowers (film), 2017 US film
April Flowers, a stripper involved in a 1961 attempt to blackmail George Ratterman